Poly(acrylic acid) (PAA; trade name Carbomer) is a polymer with the formula (CH2-CHCO2H)n. It is a derivative of acrylic acid (CH2=CHCO2H).  In addition to the homopolymers, a variety of copolymers and crosslinked polymers, and partially deprotonated derivatives thereof are known and of commercial value. In a water solution at neutral pH, PAA is an anionic polymer, i.e., many of the side chains of PAA lose their protons and acquire a negative charge. Partially or wholly deprotonated PAAs are polyelectrolytes, with the ability to absorb and retain water and swell to many times their original volume.  These properties – acid-base and water-attracting – are the bases of many applications.

Synthesis 

PAA is produced by free radical polymerization. Initiators include potassium persulfate and AIBN.

Polyacrylic acid is a polyolefin. It can be viewed as polyethylene with carboxylic acid (CO2H) substituents on alternating carbons. Owing to these groups, alternating carbon atoms in the backbone are stereogenic (colloquially: chiral). For this reason, acrylic acid exists in atactic, syndiotactic, and isotactic forms, although this aspect is rarely discussed.  The polymerization is initiated with radicals and is assumed to be stereorandom. Crosslinking can be introduced in many ways.

Production 
About 1,600,000,000 kg were produced in 2008.

Structure and derivatives
Polyacrylic acid is a weak anionic polyelectrolyte, whose degree of ionisation is dependent on solution pH. In its non-ionised form at low pHs, PAA may associate with various non-ionic polymers (such as polyethylene oxide, poly-N-vinyl pyrrolidone, polyacrylamide, and some cellulose ethers) and form hydrogen-bonded interpolymer complexes. In aqueous solutions PAA can also form polycomplexes with oppositely charged polymers such as chitosan, surfactants, and drug molecules (for example, streptomycin).

Physical properties 
Dry PAAs are sold as white, fluffy powders. In the dry powder form, the positively charged sodium ions are bound to the polyacrylate, however in aqueous solutions the sodium ions can dissociate. The presence of many metal cations allows the polymer to absorb a high amount of water.

Applications

Absorbent 
PAA is widely used in dispersants and since the molecular weight has a significant impact on the rheological properties and dispersion capacity, and hence applications. The dominant application for PAA is as a superabsorbent. About 25% of PAA is used for detergents and dispersants.

Polyacrylic acid and its derivatives are used in disposable diapers. Acrylic acid is also the main component of Superadsorbent Polymers (SAPs), cross-linked polyacrylates that can absorb and retain more than 100 times of their own weight in liquid.  The US Food and Drug Administration authorised the use of SAPs in packaging with indirect food contact.

Cleaning 
Detergents often contain copolymers of acrylic acid that assist in sequestering dirt. Cross-linked polyacrylic acid has also been used in the processing of household products, including floor cleaners. 
PAA may inactivate the antiseptic chlorhexidine gluconate.

Biocompatible materials 
The neutralized polyacrylic acid gels are suitable biocompatible matrices for medical applications such as gels for skin care products.  PAA films can be deposited on orthopaedic implants to protect them from corrosion. Crosslinked hydrogels of PAA and gelatin have also been used as medical glue.

Paints and cosmetics 
Other applications involve paints and cosmetics. They stabilize suspended solid in liquids, prevent emulsions from separating, and control the consistency in flow of cosmetics. Carbomer codes (910, 934, 940, 941, and 934P) are an indication of molecular weight and the specific components of the polymer. For many applications PAAs are used in form of alkali metal or ammonium salts, e.g. sodium polyacrylate.

Emerging applications
Hydrogels derived from PAA have attracted much study for use as bandages and aids for wound healing.

Drilling fluid and metal quenching 

A few reports were made on PAA use as deflocculant (so called alkaline polyacrylates) for oil drilling industry.

It was also reported to be used for metal quenching in metalworking (see Sodium polyacrylate).

References

Acrylate polymers
Cosmetics chemicals
Polyelectrolytes
Polymers